Liviidae is a family of plant-parasitic hemipterans in the order Hemiptera. There are more than 20 genera and 370 described species in Liviidae.

Taxonomy 
The family Liviidae can further subdivided into subfamilies and tribes, from which was based on classification of Psylloidea by Burckhardt and Ouvrard (2012) as follows:
 Diaphorininae Vondráčekv, 1951
 Diaphorina Löw, 1880
 Epipsylla Kuwayama, 1908
 Liviinae Löw, 1879
 Liviini Löw, 1879
 Aphorma Heslop-Harrison, 1952
 Crytophyllura Li, 2011
 Euphyllura Förster, 1848
 Ligustrinia Loginova, 1973
 Livia Latreille, 1804
 Syringilla Loginova, 1967
 Pachypsylloidini Loginova, 1964
 Eremopsylloides Loginova, 1964
 Pachypsylloides Bergevin, 1927
 Strophingiini
 Paurocephalinae 
 Bharatiana Mathur, 1973: Was belonged to Calophyidae
 Camarotoscena Haupt, 1935
 Diclidophlebia Crawford, 1920
 Paurocephala Crawford, 1913
 Syntomoza Enderlein, 1921

Genera 
These 29 genera belong to the family Liviidae:

 Aphorma Hodkinson, 1974
 Brachyphyllura Li, 2011
 Camarotoscena Haupt, 1935
 Caradocia Laing, 1923
 Crytophyllura Li, 2011
 Diaphorina Löw, 1880
 Diclidophlebia Crawford, 1920
 Epipsylla Kuwayama, 1908
 Eremopsylloides Loginova, 1964
 Euphyllura Förster, 1848
 Geijerolyma Froggatt, 1903
 Katacephala Crawford, 1914
 Lautereropsis Burckhardt & Malenovsky, 2003
 Leprostictopsylla Li, 2011
 Megadicrania Loginova, 1976
 Neophyllura Loginova, 1973
 Notophorina Burckhardt, 1987
 Pachypsylloides Bergevin, 1927
 Parapsylla Heslop-Harrison, 1961
 Paurocephala Crawford, 1914
 Peripsyllopsis Enderlein, 1926
 Psyllopsis Löw, 1879
 Shaerqia Kemal & Koçak, 2009
 Strophingia Enderlein, 1914
 Syntomoza Enderlein, 1921
 Syringilla Loginova, 1967
 Tuthillia Hodkinson, Brown & Burckhardt, 1986
 † Ligustrinia Loginova, 1973
 † Livia Latreille, 1804

References

Further reading

External links

 

 
Hemiptera families